If I Were a Carpenter is an album by American singer Bobby Darin, released in 1966. It was a significant change in direction for Darin considering his previous album (In a Broadway Bag) was a collection of show tunes.

History
Having previously built his career recording mainstream pop music, Darin's musical output became more "folky" as the 1960s progressed. In 1966, he charted with folksinger Tim Hardin's "If I Were a Carpenter". It was Darin's return to the Top 10 after a four-year absence (the single peaked at No. 8 in the US and No. 9 in the UK in 1966). The tracks leaned heavily towards songs by Hardin and John Sebastian — seven of the songs were written by these two songwriters and Darin's next album would follow a similar process. The song "Red Balloon" had not yet been released by Hardin. It would appear on his album 1967 album Tim Hardin 2. In his Allmusic review, Richie Unterberger, stated "Hardin himself was convinced that Darin had copied his vocal style by listening to his yet-to-be-issued version and the album as a whole boasts a production similar to the orchestrated folk-rock heard on the debut (sic) album in question, though it sounds like an inferior copy." Both Darin's If I Were a Carpenter and Hardin's Tim Hardin 2 were produced by Charles Koppelman and Don Rubin and Koppelman had originally signed Sebastian's band, The Lovin' Spoonful.

The album reached number 142 on the Billboard Pop Albums chart. Darin's cover of "Lovin' You" reached the Top 40.

If I Were a Carpenter was reissued in 1998 on the Diablo label combined with Darin's next release, Inside Out.

Reception

Music critic Richie Unterberger wrote in his Allmusic review  "... this is a fair but unexceptional record. Darin falls short of the originals on Buffy St. Marie's "Until It's Time for You to Go" and the Lovin' Spoonful's "Daydream." In fact, aside from "If I Were a Carpenter," the standout is the odd low-charting single "The Girl Who Stood Beside Me," with its odd muted psychedelic bagpipe effects constantly buzzing in the background of an actual fairly strong folk-rock tune."

Track listing
 "If I Were a Carpenter" (Tim Hardin) – 2:19
 "Reason to Believe" (Hardin) – 2:03
 "Sittin' Here Lovin' You" (John Sebastian) – 2:11
 "Misty Roses" (Hardin) – 2:17
 "Until It's Time for You to Go" (Buffy Sainte-Marie) – 2:39
 "For Baby" (John Denver) – 2:24
 "The Girl Who Stood Beside Me" (Jeffrey Stevens) – 2:26
 "Red Balloon" (Hardin) – 2:03
 "Amy" (Bobby Darin) – 2:21
 "Don't Make Promises" (Hardin) – 2:26
 "Daydream" (Sebastian) – 2:32

Personnel
Bobby Darin – vocals
Don Peake – arranger, guitar 
Dennis Budimir, Al Casey, David Cohen, Mike Deasy – guitar
Jim Gordon, Hal Blaine – drums
Larry Knechtel – keyboards
Leonard Malarsky, Sid Sharp – strings
Gary Coleman – percussion, vibraphone
Bob West – bass guitar
Harry Hymas – strings

References

1966 albums
Bobby Darin albums
Atlantic Records albums
Albums produced by Charles Koppelman